Luke James may refer to:

Luke James (footballer) (born 1994), striker for Hartlepool United
Luke James (rugby union) (born 1999), English rugby player
Luke James (singer) (born 1984), American R&B singer